Crouseville is an unincorporated village located within the town of Washburn in Aroostook County, Maine, United States.

History 
In 1800 the future Crouseville, Maine, did not have any particular name. In 1826 it was first surveyed by Joseph Norris, whereupon it became known only as a part of Township 13, Range 3.

The early settlers living along the Aroostook River couldn’t be certain if they lived in New Brunswick, a North American British Colony, or the United States. In 1839 the United States formed Aroostook County. This was an effort by the United States to lay claim to the area. In 1842 the Webster-Ashburton Treaty firmly established the area as United States territory, yet some townships in Maine were administratively part of Massachusetts, the mother state.

Salmon Brook Township (Township 13, Range 3), organized as the Plantation of Salmon Brook in the winter of 1844-1845, was one of the townships that belonged to Massachusetts, until about 1852. During this time the Crouseville area was called East Salmon Brook.

In 1850 pioneers Gould and Hepzibah (Clark) Crouse emigrated from the British Colony of New Brunswick. They, along with the families of their children, Jeremiah, Abraham, William, Esther, Ann, Jesse, Gould, Jr. and Joshua, homesteaded much of the Crouseville area.

The nearby village of Salmon Brook incorporated into the city of Washburn in 1861 and East Salmon Brook thereafter was commonly referred to as East Washburn. Finally, in 1897, the community was formally named Crouseville, after pioneers Gould and Hepzibah Crouse and their descendants.

Cemeteries
Crouseville Pioneer Cemetery
First known burial, Duncan Christie, drowned at Rum Rapids (Crouseville) December 18, 1857.

First known burial, Marshall Crouse (b. March 29, 1875 - d. January 9, 1876).
Hillside Grove Cemetery
Established c. 1995.

Geography
Crouseville is located at 46°45'18" North, 68°0'5" West (46.7550419, -68.0964202). Its elevation is 449 feet (137 m). The town is situated next to the Aroostook River and three of its permanent river islands; Crouse Island, Churchill Island and Bull Island. Rum Rapids flow near Churchill Island.

Climate
This climatic region is typified by large seasonal temperature differences, with warm to hot (and often humid) summers and cold (sometimes severely cold) winters.  According to the Köppen Climate Classification system, Crouseville has a humid continental climate, abbreviated "Dfb" on climate maps.

Recreation
Aroostook County’s 1600-mile snowmobile trail system, Northeast Snowmobile Trail (NEST), runs through the heart of Crouseville and interconnects with the International Snowmobile Trail System linking Maine, New Hampshire, Vermont, and the Province of Quebec.

Nearby downhill and cross-country skiing facilities are available at 10th Mountain Ski Center, Nordic Heritage Ski Center, Big Rock Alpine Skiway and Quoggy Jo Community Alpine Area.

Education 
Crouseville is located in Maine School Administrative District 45. The University of Maine at Presque Isle and Northern Maine Community College are both located six miles to the east in Presque Isle, Maine.

References

Crouse, R. "Crouse Family History" Rogue Publishing, 2000.
Umphrey, Donovan, G. McBurnie, Snell, M. McBurnie, Crouse "Crouseville Pioneer Cemetery" Rogue Publishing, 2006.

External links
Crouseville, Maine
Crouseville Pioneer Cemetery
Crouseville Photographs
Crouseville Aerial View

See also
Northern Maine Regional Airport at Presque Isle, the airport (PQI) that serves Crouseville.

Villages in Aroostook County, Maine